Vancicăuți may refer to:

 , a village in Cepeleuți Commune, Edineț District, Moldova
 Vancicăuții Mari, the Romanian name for Vanchikivtsi Commune, Novoselytsia Raion, Ukraine
 Vancicăuții Mici, the Romanian name for Novoivankivtsi village, Kostychany Commune, Novoselytsia Raion, Ukraine